Tomislav "Tom" Pondeljak (born 8 January 1976 in Melbourne, Victoria, Australia) is a retired Australian football (soccer) player who last played for Victorian Premier League side St Albans Saints SC.

Club career
Pondeljak started his career in the Victorian Institute of Sport (VIS) before playing for St Albans, making 62 appearances in his -year spell at the lower league Victorian club. He was then brought into the National Soccer League (NSL) by the Melbourne Knights and helped them to victory during the 1995–96 NSL season. After playing another  years and a total of 97 appearances for the Melbourne club, he moved to Sydney United.

Not much success was had in his two years at the club, and Pondeljak eventually moved to cross town rivals Sydney Olympic, where he won his second NSL title. He then moved on to Perth Glory, where he won his third NSL title. Following the collapse of the NSL at the end of the 2003/04 season, he went to Malaysia and played for Johor FC.

When the A-League was formed, Pondeljak was being chased by a number of teams including Sydney FC, Perth Glory, Newcastle Jets and his hometown team Melbourne Victory but it was the Central Coast Mariners who made the best offer and he accepted that offer, becoming one of the marquee signings for the Mariners.

The 2005/06 season was not the best for Pondeljak as he was injured for about two months with a fractured and dislocated wrist. He did however produce one of the goals of the season against Sydney FC. He ran into the penalty area, turned three Sydney FC players and slotted the ball past the outstretched arm of goalkeeper Clint Bolton. He scored the only goal of the Preliminary Final against Adelaide United to send the Central Coast Mariners into the Grand Final.

On 27 February 2008, Pondeljak signed a two-year contract with Melbourne Victory.

Pondeljak was promoted to Victory's starting 11 following his debut against South Korea's Chunnam Dragons and proved his worth on four minutes with a cracking shot from outside the penalty area that gave the visitors a perfect start.

On 28 January 2009, Pondeljak started for Australia in their Asian Cup qualifying match against Indonesia, which was Pondeljak's first international appearance in seven years, and added to the four caps he had earned back in 2002.

A month later, on 28 February 2009, Pondeljak scored what proved to be the winning goal in Melbourne Victory's 1–0 triumph over arch-rivals Adelaide United in the A-League Grand Final. He was later substituted for teammate Grant Brebner and was awarded the Joe Marston Medal for man of the match.

Pondeljak left Melbourne Victory at the conclusion of the 2011–12 A-League season and returned to boyhood club St Albans Saints.

Pondeljak retired at the end of the 2013 Victorian State League One season, helping Dinamo avoid relegation in a tough season.

A-League career statistics
(Correct as of 5 February 2010)

National team statistics

Honours
With Melbourne Victory:
 A-League Championship: 2008-2009
 A-League Premiership: 2008-2009
With Central Coast Mariners:
 A-League Premiership: 2007-2008
With Perth Glory:
 NSL Championship: 2003-2004
With Sydney Olympic:
 NSL Championship: 2001-2002
With Melbourne Knights:
 NSL Championship: 1995-1996

References

External links
 Melbourne Victory profile
 Oz Football profile
 Feature Article on SMH

1976 births
Living people
Soccer players from Melbourne
Association football midfielders
Australia international soccer players
Australian expatriate soccer players
Expatriate footballers in Malaysia
Australian people of Croatian descent
A-League Men players
National Soccer League (Australia) players
Central Coast Mariners FC players
Melbourne Knights FC players
Melbourne Victory FC players
Perth Glory FC players
Sydney United 58 FC players
Sydney Olympic FC players
Victorian Institute of Sport alumni
Australian soccer players
2002 OFC Nations Cup players
Australian expatriate sportspeople in Malaysia